Lagergren is a Swedish surname that may refer to
 The House of Lagergren, a family of the Swedish nobility
Albin Lagergren (born 1992), Swedish handball player
Joakim Lagergren (born 1991), Swedish professional golfer
Nina Lagergren (1921–2019), Swedish businesswoman and half-sister of Raoul Wallenberg

Swedish-language surnames